United Workers Cooperatives, also known as Allerton Coops, is a historic apartment building complex located at 2700–2870 Bronx Park East in Allerton and the "Commie Coops, Bronx, New York City. The complex includes three contributing buildings and five contributing structures.  The Tudor Revival style buildings were built during two construction campaigns, 1926–1927 and 1927–1929 by the United Workers' Association.  The buildings feature half timbered gables, horizontal half-timbered bands topped with sloping slate roofs, corbelled and crenellated towers, and picturesque chimneys.

The complex was built by the United Workers' Association (part of the Industrial Workers of the World or "IWW"), and was an important early example of cooperative housing for working-class people.  Most of the Association members were secular Jews with Communist political leanings who were engaged in the needle trades.  The association sought to improve the living standards of its members, many of whom lived in squalid conditions in the tenements of the Lower East Side.  It bought a plot of land in an undeveloped section of the Bronx, near the open space of Bronx Park, and envisioned a community of socially and politically engaged residents who would each have an equal say in the running of the complex, regardless of the size of their apartments or the prices that they paid for them.  The complex had classrooms, a library, and other amenities and activities that were uncommon in other cooperative complexes that were built for profit.  Though considered a social success, the complex failed financially in the Great Depression and was converted to rental housing in 1943.  After decades of neglect by a succession of landlords, the complex was purchased and renovated by a new owner in the mid-1980s.

The complex was listed on the National Register of Historic Places in 1986, and was designated a National Historic Landmark in 1991.  It was designated a New York City landmark in 1992.

See also
 Amalgamated Housing Cooperative
List of National Historic Landmarks in New York City
National Register of Historic Places listings in Bronx County, New York

References

External links

United Workers' Cooperative Colony (The Coops), Flickr.com website

Residential buildings on the National Register of Historic Places in New York City
Tudor Revival architecture in New York City
Residential buildings completed in 1926
Residential buildings in the Bronx
National Register of Historic Places in the Bronx
National Historic Landmarks in New York City